Thorne St Margaret is a village in the civil parish of Wellington Without in the Taunton Deane district of Somerset, England. It is situated 3 miles west of Wellington, between the river Tone and the Bristol and Exeter railway. The parish includes Holywell Lake which is one of the Thankful Villages which lost no men in World War I.

The parish of Thorne St Margaret was part of the Milverton Hundred.

The Church of St Margaret serves a parish population of about 50. The church has a 15th-century tower with three bells. The rest of the church was rebuilt in 1865, with a west window, with stained glass, added in 1907. The church is built of hard red sandstone and has a baptismal font dating to Saxon times.
It has been designated by English Heritage as a Grade II* listed building.

References and external links

External links

Villages in Taunton Deane